William Ernest Amery (16 September 1894 – 2 May 1966) was an Australian rules footballer who played with Richmond in the Victorian Football League (VFL).

Notes

External links 
		

1894 births
1966 deaths
Australian rules footballers from Victoria (Australia)
Richmond Football Club players
Camberwell Football Club players